Bachman is an Anglicized spelling of the surname Bachmann. Notable people with the surname include:
Alex Bachman (born 1996), American football player
Andrew Bachman (born 1983), American entrepreneur
Bill Bachman (born 1952), American percussionist
Charlie Bachman (1892–1985), American football player and coach
Charles Bachman (1924–2017), American computer scientist
Charles A. Bachman (1882–1966), American actor
Daniel Bachman (born 1989), American guitarist
Darrick Bachman (born 1960), American television writer
Elisabeth Bachman (born 1978), American volleyball player
Gábor Bachman (born 1952), Hungarian architect
Henry L. Bachman (born 1930), American electrical engineer
Isaac Bachman (born 1957), Israeli diplomat
James Bachman (born 1972), British comedian and writer
Jay Bachman (born 1945), American football player
John Bachman (1790–1874), American naturalist
Lorelei Bachman (born 1973), Canadian songwriter
Melissa Bachman (born 1984), American hunter
Nathan L. Bachman (1878–1937), American politician
Randy Bachman (born 1943), Canadian musician
Reuben Knecht Bachman (1834–1911), American politician
Richard Bachman (ice hockey) (born 1987), American ice hockey player
Robbie Bachman (born 1953), Canadian drummer
S. A. Bachman (born 1957), American artist and advocate
Sam Bachman (born 1999), American baseball player
Tal Bachman (born 1968), Canadian musician
Ted Bachman (born 1952), American football player
Tim Bachman (born 1951), Canadian guitarist
Walter Bachman (disambiguation), multiple people
William Bachman (1908–1993), American politician

References

Jewish surnames